Lissotesta unifilosa is a species of sea snail, a marine gastropod mollusk, unassigned in the superfamily Seguenzioidea.

Description
The height of the shell reaches 2 mm.

Distribution
This marine species occurs off South Georgia and the Antarctic Peninsula at depths between 94 m and 120 m.

References

External links
 To World Register of Marine Species

unifilosa
Gastropods described in 1912